Microdipoena is a cosmopolitan genus of dwarf cobweb weaver spiders in the family Mysmenidae, containing sixteen species. Four new species were discovered from 2003 and 2013.

Species
 Microdipoena comorensis (Baert, 1986) — Comoro Is
 Microdipoena elsae Saaristo, 1978 — Seychelles, DR Congo, Comoro Is.
 Microdipoena gongi (Yin, Peng & Bao, 2004) — China
 Microdipoena guttata Banks, 1895 — USA to Paraguay
 Microdipoena illectrix  (Simon, 1895) — Philippines
 Microdipoena jobi  (Kraus, 1967) — Palearctic 
 Microdipoena menglunensis (Lin & Li, 2008)  — China
 Microdipoena mihindi  (Baert, 1989) — Rwanda
 Microdipoena nyungwe Baert, 1989 — Rwanda
 Microdipoena ogatai  (Ono, 2007) — Japan
 Microdipoena papuana  (Baert, 1984) — New Guinea
 Microdipoena pseudojobi (Lin & Li, 2008) — China, Japan
 Microdipoena saltuensis  (Simon, 1895) — Sri Lanka
 Microdipoena samoensis (Marples, 1955) — Samoa, Hawaii
 Microdipoena vanstallei Baert, 1985 — Cameroon
 Microdipoena yinae  (Lin & Li, 2013)  — China

References

Mysmenidae
Araneomorphae genera
Cosmopolitan spiders